KTSM (690 kHz) is a commercial AM radio station licensed to El Paso, Texas.  It is owned by iHeartMedia, Inc. and airs a talk radio format.  The studios are on North Mesa Drive in west central El Paso.

KTSM broadcasts with 10,000 watts around the clock.  Because the station operates on 690 kHz, a Mexican and Canadian clear-channel frequency, KTSM uses a directional antenna with a four-tower array to avoid interfering with other stations at the same dial position.  The transmitter is off O'Brian Street near U.S. Route 54 in north east El Paso.

Programming
KTSM has one local show on weekdays, Talk El Paso with Andrew Polk, heard in afternoon drive time.  The rest of the schedule is made up of nationally syndicated talk shows, mostly supplied by Premiere Networks, a subsidiary of iHeartMedia: The Glenn Beck Program, The Clay Travis and Buck Sexton Show, The Sean Hannity Show, The Jesse Kelly Show, The Mark Levin Show, Coast to Coast AM with George Noory and This Morning, America's First News with Gordon Deal. 

Weekends feature a mix of local and syndicated shows on money, health, technology, travel, home repair and the law.  Weekend programs include The Kim Komando Show, Bill Handel on The Law, At Home with Gary Sullivan, Beyond the Beltway with Bruce DuMont, Sunday Nights with Bill Cunningham, The Travel Show with Larry Gelwix and Somewhere in Time with Art Bell.  Some weekend hours are paid brokered programming.  Most hours begin with an update from Fox News Radio.

History

Early years
At first, it was powered at only 100 watts, broadcasting on 1310 kilocycles, and sharing time with another radio station, KDAH. Eventually, the Tri-State Broadcasting Company owned both stations. They were consolidated under the KTSM call sign, which represents the words "Tri-State Media". The original studios were in the historic Hotel Paso del Norte on Sheldon Court at South Santa Fe Street.

With the enactment of the North American Regional Broadcasting Agreement (NARBA) in 1941, KTSM's frequency was shifted to 1380 kHz.  Daytime power was increased to 1,000 watts, and 500 watts at night, when radio waves travel farther.  KTSM was a CBS Radio Network affiliate, airing its schedule of dramas, comedies, news, sports, soap operas, game shows and big band broadcasts during the "Golden Age of Radio."

TV and FM stations
In 1953, KTSM added a television station, Channel 9 KTSM-TV, the second TV outlet in El Paso.  Because KTSM radio was a CBS affiliate, KTSM-TV also began carrying CBS TV shows.  As network programming moved from radio to television in the 1950s, KTSM 1380 switched to a full service, middle of the road format, including popular adult music, news and sports.

In 1962, an FM station was added.  99.9 KTSM-FM began broadcasting with a beautiful music format, separate from the AM station.  The FM transmitter was co-located with the TV tower.

News and talk
In 1975, NBC Radio established an all-news radio network known as the "News and Information Service" (NIS).  KTSM 1380 was one of the stations to join NIS, while also keeping its CBS News affiliation as well.  The network failed to gain enough affiliates and was discontinued at the end of 1977.

For several years, KTSM did its own all-news programming, using the services of CBS and NBC for world and national news, and a staff of local reporters for El Paso and Texas news.  Over time, talk shows were added until KTSM became a talk radio station.

Switch to AM 690
In 1947, KEPO signed on the air in El Paso at 690 kHz.  It was powered at 5,000 watts and was owned by H.J. Griffith, who served as station president.  It later switched its call letters to KHEY, airing a country music format for many years.

In 1998, San Antonio-based Clear Channel Communications acquired both KTSM-AM-FM and KHEY-AM-FM.  Under Clear Channel management, the two AM stations' frequencies were switched in 2000.  KHEY, which had still been playing country music on the AM dial, was moved to AM 1380.  KTSM and its talk format took over the AM 690 frequency, giving it wider coverage.  AM stations lower on the dial have a bigger range, plus AM 690 is powered at 10,000 watts, while AM 1380 broadcasts at 5,000 watts by day, 500 watts at night.  The new 1380 KHEY flipped to a sports radio format.

Clear Channel Communications was renamed iHeartMedia in 2014.

References

External links
News Talk 690 - Official Website

TSM
News and talk radio stations in the United States
Radio stations established in 1947
1947 establishments in Texas
IHeartMedia radio stations